Rugby Australia Ltd, previously named the Australian Rugby Union Limited and Australian Rugby Football Union Limited, is an Australian company operating the premier rugby union competition in Australia and teams. It has its origins in 1949. It is a member of World Rugby. Rugby Australia has eight member unions, representing each state and the Australian Northern Territory and Australian Capital Territory. It also manages national representative rugby union teams, including the Wallabies and the Wallaroos.

History 

Until the end of the 1940s, the New South Wales Rugby Union, as the senior rugby organisation in Australia, was responsible for administration of a national representative rugby team, including all tours. However, the various state unions agreed that the future of rugby in Australia would be better served by having a national administrative body and so the Australian Rugby Football Union was formed at a conference in Sydney in 1945, acting initially in an advisory capacity only. Additional impetus came in 1948 when the International Rugby Football Board invited Australia specifically (rather than a New South Wales representative), to take a seat on the Board.

The constitution of the Australian Rugby Football Union was ratified on 25 November 1949 at the inaugural council meeting of eleven delegates from the state unions of New South Wales, Queensland, South Australia, Western Australia, Tasmania and Victoria. The ACT Rugby Union gained membership in 1972. The Northern Territory Rugby Union joined in 1978, initially as an associate union before later being granted membership and voting rights.

In 1985 the Australian Rugby Football Union was incorporated as a company (ACN 002 898 544). In 1997, it was renamed Australian Rugby Union Limited, known as the ARU and again renamed, in 2017, as Rugby Australia Limited.

A founding member, the New South Wales Rugby Union, lost two affiliated regional organisations in 2004 when they affiliated to the ACT Rugby Union which became the ACT and Southern NSW Rugby Union.

Rugby Australia's major sponsor, since 2004, is Qantas.  Qantas has had official naming rights for the 'Qantas Wallabies'.

In 2017, the Australian Rugby Union was re-branded Rugby Australia, coinciding with relocating to their new premises in Moore Park, Sydney.

In July 2021, Rugby Australia announced plans are underway to construct an Australian Rugby Museum. It will feature items from Wallabies and Wallaroos history along with the provincial history of the sport, dating back to the late 19th century.

Governance
The organisation's governing structures were overhauled in December 2012, following a review authored by the former federal senator and Minister for Sport, Mark Arbib.

Members
Rugby Australia's members (shareholders) include state and territory Rugby unions, together with the owners of the Super Rugby bodies within Australia and the Rugby Union Players' Association (RUPA).

Members exercise their voting rights at the annual general meeting. Under the new constitution adopted in 2012, the eight existing state and territory member unions, the RUPA and each Super Rugby team owner each provide a delegate who has one allocated vote. A delegate from a member union with more than 50,000 registered players in their region is granted a second vote. Only the New South Wales Rugby Union and Queensland Rugby Union exceed that mark at present, so the total number of members' votes is currently sixteen. There are also a number of affiliated groups that do not have voting rights.

Under this revised governance system, a greater share of influence and control shifted from grass roots team and club representation through the state and territory unions to commercial team owners and the professional players association.

Note: The Australian Society of Rugby Referees, and Australian Universities Rugby Union were also previously non-voting affiliates until 2005 and 2014, respectively. New South Wales Country Rugby Union and Sydney Rugby Union were also non-voting affiliates until April 2017.

Prior to 2012, the voting franchise made no allowance for Super Rugby teams or the Players' Association. There were simply fourteen votes split as follows:
 
 NSW Rugby Union: 5
 Queensland Rugby Union: 3
 Other state and territory member unions: 1 each

Board and executive
The board must have at least six independent directors, appointed to three-year terms by a two-thirds majority vote of members, in addition to the managing director (chief executive). Up to two further directors may be appointed by ordinary resolution of the board. The board may elect one of the directors as the chair, with the position to be formally reconsidered at least every three years. Executive officers, including the chief executive, are appointed by the board of directors.

List of chairpersons from 1996 onwards:
Hamish McLennan (2020–present)
 Paul McLean, interim (2020)
 Cameron Clyne (2015–2020)
 Michael Hawker (2012–2015)
 Peter McGrath (2007–2012)
 Ron Graham (2005–2007)
 Dilip Kumar (2005)
 Bob Tuckey (2001–2005)
 David Clarke (1998–2001)
 Dick McGruther (1996–1998)
 Leo Williams (1994–1996)

List of chief executives from 1996 onwards:* 
Andy Marinos (2021–present)
 Rob Clarke, interim (2020–2021)
 Raelene Castle (2017–2020)
 Bill Pulver (2013–2017)
 John O'Neill (2007–2013)
 Gary Flowers (2004–2007)
 Matt Carroll, interim (2003)
 John O'Neill (1995–2003)

Teams
National teams
Wallabies – the national rugby union team.
Wallaroos – the national women's rugby union team.

National sevens teams
Men's 7s – the national rugby union seven-a-side team.
Women's 7s - the national women's seven-a-side rugby union team.

Other teams
Junior Wallabies – the under-20 age graded side that competes for the World Rugby Junior Championship.
Australian Schoolboys – a representative team of school players that has developed some of today's current Wallabies.

Former teams
Australia A – the former second-level national rugby union team behind the Wallabies.
Under 21s – a former age graded side that has developed players who went on to become Wallabies.
Under 19s – a former age graded side that has developed players who went on to become Wallabies.

Hall of Fame
Rugby Australia promotes and selects a Hall of Fame honouring notable former players. Each year two or three of Australia's greats from all eras of the international game are selected by an eight-man committee to be inducted into the Wallaby Hall of Fame. Inductees are drawn from all Test teams starting with the first side in 1899. Consideration is given to a player's on-field career but induction is not based on statistical achievement alone.

To be eligible for inclusion in the Wallaby Hall of Fame, a player must have:
 Played at least one Test for Australia
 Been retired from Rugby for at least 10 years
 Made a major contribution to the game of Rugby
 Demonstrated outstanding ability, sportsmanship, commitment, character and personal contribution to their team and the game in their era.

Hall of Fame members:

Controversies

Support for same-sex marriage
In 2017, Rugby Australia management declared itself in favour of same-sex marriage

Israel Folau saga
In 2018, Rugby Australia became involved in a controversy with player and Christian preacher Israel Folau over his social media posts expressing his religious views seeking to save homosexuals from hell when he called on them to "repent of their sins and turn to God". On 17 May 2019, Rugby Australia terminated Folau's player contract. On 6 June 2019, Folau launched legal proceedings with the Fair Work Commission against Rugby Australia and the Waratahs under section 772 of the Fair Work Act, which makes it unlawful to terminate employment on the basis of religion. The Australian Christian Lobby (ACL) announced on 25 June 2019 that it was donating $100,000 to Folau and was setting up an donation site for his legal costs. The campaign raised over $2 million in two days before being paused by the ACL with Folau's consent. On 19 July 2019, the Fair Work Commission issued a certificate confirming all reasonable attempts to resolve the dispute between Folau and Rugby Australia had been unsuccessful. On 1 August 2019, Folau launched legal action in the Federal Circuit Court of Australia, against RA and NSW Rugby for unlawful termination on the basis of religion, breach of contract and restraint of trade. Folau sought an apology, compensation, penalties and the right to play rugby union again. In November 2019, Folau increased his compensation claim against Rugby Australia to $14 million, claiming that he could have been a Wallabies captain.

Folau and Rugby Australia issued a joint statement and apology on 4 December 2019 that stated no harm had been intended by either party and announced that a confidential settlement had been reached.

Financial Crisis
Rugby Australia's parlous financial position following the Folau affair became apparent upon the COVID-19 outbreak in 2020 when it was forced to lay off three quarters of its employees and seek agreements with players to reduce payments. The CEO, Raelene Castle was replaced and calls continued for a shake-up of the board and management.

See also

 Rugby Union Players' Association

References

External links

Sources

External links

Archives

Member webpages

 
Australia
1945 establishments in Australia
Sports organizations established in 1945
Australia